George Floyd protests in Washington may refer to:

 George Floyd protests in Washington (state)
 George Floyd protests in Washington, D.C.